Iwai or IWAI may refer to:

Iwai (surname)
Iwai, Ibaraki, a city in Japan
Iwai Station, a railway station in Minamibōsō, Chiba Prefecture, Japan
Iwai Rebellion, a rebellion against the Yamato court that took place in Tsukushi Province, Japan
I'wai, the culture hero of the Koko Y'ao in Australian Aboriginal mythology
Inland Waterways Authority of India
Inland Waterways Association of Ireland
wikt:祝い, いわい、romaji iwai, a Japanese word meaning celebration or gift.